Tollarp is a locality situated in Kristianstad Municipality, Skåne County, Sweden it had 3,284 inhabitants in 2010. It is located approximately 16 km (10 mi) south-west of the city of Kristianstad along the E22 route between Malmö and Kristianstad (Malmövägen).

References 

Populated places in Kristianstad Municipality
Populated places in Skåne County